Sir James Thompson  (6 July 184828 December 1929) was a British civil servant and administrator who acted as the governor of Madras from 30 April 1904 to 13 December 1904.

Early life and education 

James Thompson was born in 1848 to John Thomson in Cults, Aberdeenshire. He had his schooling at Grammar school and graduated from the University of Aberdeen. He completed his master's degree in 1868 and qualified for the Indian Civil Service in 1869.

Service in India 

Thompson arrived in India in 1871 and served as Assistant Collector in the Madras Presidency from 1872 to 1882, as Head Assistant Collector from 1882 to 1885 as Sub-Collector from 1885 to 1889 and Collector from 1889 to 1895. In 1895, Thompson was appointed Resident for the Travancore and Cochin states and served from 1895 to 1897 when he was appointed to the Board of Revenue for the Madras Presidency. 

Thompson was nominated to the Madras Legislative Council in 1898 and served as a member of the Executive Council of the Governor of Madras from 1901 to 1906. Thomson acted as the Governor of Madras from 30 April 1904 to 13 December 1904 in the absence of Oliver Russell, 2nd Baron Ampthill who was selected to officiate temporarily as the Viceroy of India. In 1908, Thompson was nominated to the council of the Secretary of State for India.

Honours 

Thompson was made a Knight Commander of the Order of the Star of India in the year 1904.

Family 
Thompson married Charlotte Georgina Grant, the eldest daughter of William White Grant in 1873. He married secondly Margaret Ellen Todhunter, the daughter of Sir Charles Todhunter, in 1898.

References

1848 births
1929 deaths
Indian Civil Service (British India) officers
Alumni of the University of Aberdeen
Knights Commander of the Order of the Star of India
Governors of Madras
People from Aberdeenshire